Caleb Baragar (born April 9, 1994) is an American professional baseball pitcher in the Cleveland Guardians organization. He pitched in college baseball for Jackson College and Indiana University.  Baragar was drafted by the San Francisco Giants in the ninth round of the 2016 MLB draft. He made his MLB debut in 2020.

Amateur career
Bargar attended Jenison High School, where he threw two no hitters. He pitched his first two collegiate seasons for Jackson College in 2013 and 2014.  He transferred to Indiana University for his final two years, in 2015 and 2016.

Baragar was drafted by the San Francisco Giants in the ninth round (275th overall) of the 2016 MLB draft.

Professional career

San Francisco Giants
After spending parts of four seasons in the minor leagues, in which he was 18–20 with a 3.82 ERA, and being named a 2019 Eastern League Mid-Season All-Star, Baragar was invited to spring training for the Giants in 2020. Baragar made the Giants 2020 Opening Day roster and his contract was selected to the 40-man roster.

He made his MLB debut on July 25, 2020, earning the win after pitching two scoreless innings in relief against the Los Angeles Dodgers.

In 2020 he was 5–1 with a 4.03 ERA, pitching 22.1 innings in 24 games (one start). He was second in the NL in win–loss percentage (.833; behind Max Fried).

In the 2021 regular season with the Giants, he was 2–1 with 2 saves and a 1.57 ERA. He pitched in 25 games, pitching 23 innings in relief. With AAA Sacramento, he was 3–3 with an 8.46 ERA, pitching 22.1 innings in 22 games (one start). He was designated for assignment on March 14, 2022, to create room on the roster for free agent signing Carlos Rodon.

Arizona Diamondbacks
On March 21, 2022, Baragar was claimed off of waivers by the Arizona Diamondbacks. He was designated for assignment on April 5, 2022. On April 10, Baragar was outrighted to the Triple-A Reno Aces. He elected free agency after the 2022 season.

Cleveland Guardians
On December 22, 2022, Baragar signed a minor league deal with the Cleveland Guardians. The deal includes an invitation to the Guardians' 2023 major league spring training camp.

References

External links

1994 births
Living people
People from Jenison, Michigan
Baseball players from Michigan
Major League Baseball pitchers
San Francisco Giants players
Indiana Hoosiers baseball players
Arizona League Giants players
San Jose Giants players
Augusta GreenJackets players
Sacramento River Cats players
Richmond Flying Squirrels players